The Devil's Pass is a 1957 British drama film directed by Darcy Conyers and starring John Slater and Joan Newell. It was produced at Kensington Studios in London as a second feature. The film's sets were designed by the art director Ken Adam.

Cast
 John Slater as Bill Buckle
 Christopher Warbey as Jim
 Joan Newell as 	Nan Trewney
 Charles Leno as 	Headmaster
 Joy Rodgers as 	Kitchen Maid
 Richard George as 	Ted Trelawney
 Archie Duncan as 	George Jolly
 Ewen Solon as Job Jolly
 Clem Listeras Grunt Jolly 
 Peter Martyn as 	Mr. Smith
 Martin Wyldeck as Young Master
 Diana Hope as 	Pretty Girl
 Bart Allison as 	Watkins
 Frank Hawkins as 	Man in Pub
 Roger Slater as 	1st. Boy
 Jeremy Moray as	2nd. Boy
 Ernest Lister as 	Harry

References

Bibliography
 Chibnall, Steve & McFarlane, Brian. The British 'B' Film. Palgrave MacMillan, 2009.

External links
 

1957 films
1957 drama films
British drama films
Films shot at Kensington Studios
1950s English-language films
1950s British films